The Halder Diaries is a collection of diaries written by German Colonel General Franz Halder. His diaries from his time as Chief of the Army General Staff have been an important primary source for authors who have written about such subjects as Adolf Hitler, World War II and the Nazi Party.

He was able to make extensive notes of Hitler’l's conversations or closed speeches to generals using shorthand. In William Shirer's The Rise and Fall of the Third Reich, Halder's diary entries are cited hundreds of times.

The diaries were published as The Halder Diaries: The Private War Journals of Colonel General Franz Halder in two volumes in 1976 by Westview Press of Boulder, Colorado, with an introduction by Trevor N. Dupuy. The original German version had the title Kriegstagebuch ("War Diaries"), and the translation had been published in eight volumes in 1948 by the Office of Chief Counsel for War Crimes, Office of Military Government for Germany (U.S.).

References

 

World War II memoirs
Diaries